Whitlingham was a station in Whitlingham, Norfolk. The simple station has been demolished leaving no trace of its existence. However the footbridge is still in use for pedestrian use.

Just east (away from Norwich and not in the photo) of the footbridge is the junction where services to Sheringham split from services to Lowestoft and Great Yarmouth.

References

Disused railway stations in Norfolk
Former Great Eastern Railway stations
Railway stations in Great Britain opened in 1874
Railway stations in Great Britain closed in 1955